The Coca-Cola Classic 12 Hours of Sebring, was the third round of the 1985 IMSA GT Championship. The race was held at the Sebring International Raceway, on March 23, 1985. Victory overall went to the No. 8 Preston Henn Porsche 962 driven by A. J. Foyt, and Bob Wollek.

Race results
Class winners in bold.

Class Winners

References

IMSA GTP
12 Hours of Sebring
12 Hours of Sebring
Sebring
12 Hours of Sebring